The 2016 North American Soccer League season is the 49th season of Division II soccer in the United States and Canada, and the 6th season of the modern North American Soccer League.

Three expansion clubs joined the league, with Miami FC and Rayo OKC joining in the Spring season and Puerto Rico FC beginning competition in the Fall season. In December, 2015, the San Antonio Scorpions' home stadium, Toyota Field, was bought by the city of San Antonio for use by Spurs Sports & Entertainment to host a club in the USL, forcing the Scorpions to cease operations. In January, 2016, the NASL suspended its operation of the Atlanta Silverbacks for the 2016 season and possibly beyond.  As a result, the Spring season was contested by 11 clubs and the Fall season by 12. The New York Cosmos are defending Soccer Bowl champions. A split season format was used for the 2016 season.

Teams, stadiums, and personnel

Stadiums and locations

Personnel and sponsorship

Player transfers

Managerial changes

Spring season

Standings

Results

Fall season

Standings

Results

Playoffs

Combined standings

The Championship

Participants
 (1) New York Cosmos (Fall season champion)
 (2) Indy Eleven (Spring season champion)
 (3) FC Edmonton
 (4) Rayo OKC

Semifinals

Soccer Bowl 2016

Attendance 

Source: NASL

Highest attendances 
Regular season

Statistical leaders

Top scorers 

Source:

Top assists 

Source:

|}

Clean sheets

Source: NASL

Hat-tricks

|}

Awards

Monthly awards

Weekly awards

League awards

 Golden Ball (MVP):  Juan Arango (New York Cosmos) 
Golden Boot: Christian Ramirez (Minnesota United) 
 Golden Glove: Matt Van Oekel (FC Edmonton) 
 Coach of the Year: Tim Hankinson (Indy Eleven) 
 Goal of the Year: Duke Lacroix (Indy Eleven) 
 Young (U24) Player of the Year: Papé Diakité (FC Edmonton) 
 Humanitarian of the Year: Michael Lahoud (Miami FC) 
 Fair Play Award: Carolina RailHawks

References

External links
 

 
North American Soccer League seasons